Darren Hayman & the Secondary Modern are a British band who have released four albums. Darren Hayman has previously performed with Hefner and The French, and continues to collaborate with ex-members of both bands. The name of the band refers to a type of school which existed in post-war Britain.

Since 2012, Hayman's backing bands have been known as The Long Parliament and The Short Parliament.

Studio albums
 Darren Hayman & the Secondary Modern (2007, Track & Field)
 Pram Town (2009, Track & Field)
 Essex Arms (2010, Fortuna Pop!)
 The Green and the Grey (2011, Belka)

British indie rock groups
British folk rock groups
2007 establishments in England
Musical groups established in 2007